Christine Anu (born 15 March 1970) is an Australian singer, songwriter and actress. She gained popularity with the cover song release of the Warumpi Band's song "My Island Home". Anu has been nominated for 17 ARIA Awards.

Early life
Anu was born on 15 March 1970 in Cairns, Queensland, to a Torres Strait Islander mother from Saibai.

Anu attended Emmaus College in Rockhampton where she graduated from in 1987 before studying at the National Aboriginal and Islander Skills Development Association in Sydney.

Music career

Anu began performing as a dancer and later went on to sing back-up vocals for the Rainmakers, which included Neil Murray of the Warumpi Band. Her first recording was in 1993 with "Last Train", a dance remake of a Paul Kelly song. The follow-up, "Monkey and the Turtle", was based on a traditional story. After "My Island Home", she released her first album, Stylin' Up, which went platinum.

In 1995, Neil Murray won an Australasian Performing Right Association songwriting award for writing "My Island Home". Anu won an ARIA Award for best female recording artist as well as a Deadly Sounds National Aboriginal & Islander Music Awards award in 1996 for best female artist.

Baz Luhrmann asked her to sing on the song "Now Until the Break of Day" on his Something for Everybody album. It was released as a single and the video then won another ARIA award and led to her being cast in Moulin Rouge!.

In January 1998, Anu teamed up with Archie Roach, Paul Kelly, Judith Durham, Renee Geyer, Kutcha Edwards and Tiddas and formed Singers for the Red Black and Gold. Together they released a cover of "Yil Lull".

In 2000, Anu released Come My Way which peaked at number 18 on the ARIA albums chart and went gold. In 2000 she sang the song "My Island Home" at the Sydney 2000 Olympics Closing Ceremony.

In November 2003, Anu released her third studio album, 45 Degrees.

In 2007, Anu toured a children's show and released an associate album titled Chrissy's Island Family. The album gained an ARIA Award nomination.

On 26 September 2010, she released a new digital only single, "Come Home".

On 7 November 2014, Anu released a Christmas album, titled Island Christmas.

In March 2018, Anu released a duet version of "Without You" from the musical Rent with Greg Gould. The lyric video featured photography from around the world, each photo with a splash of red for HIV/AIDS support and awareness.

Acting and TV career
Anu has also had an acting career in film, stage and television. She appeared in Dating the Enemy, a 1996 Australian film starring Guy Pearce and Claudia Karvan. She then appeared in an Australian production of the stage musical Little Shop of Horrors in the same year.

Anu's stage career developed with a starring role in the original Australian production of Rent in 1998 and 1999. Anu was offered a role in a Broadway production of this musical but had to decline due to commitments in recording her second album. Her links with Baz Luhrmann led to him offering her a part in Moulin Rouge!. In 2003, she appeared as Kali in The Matrix Reloaded and played the character on the video game Enter the Matrix.

In 2004, she became a judge on Popstars Live, a television quest broadcast on the Seven Network at 6.30 pm on Sunday night in Australia along the lines of Australian Idol. The program failed to achieve a similar level of success, leading network executives to pressure the judges to offer harsher criticism of the contestants. Anu refused to offer harsher criticism, leading to her resignation as a judge in April 2004. In a statement issued on her departure, she said: "I chose to play a positive role model and wanted to encourage these young people in their endeavours, rather than criticise them. Although leaving Popstars Live was a difficult decision for me to make, I do feel somewhat relieved that I can now focus on my music."

In 2009, Anu participated in Who Do You Think You Are. She appeared again on television in 2012, in the Australian sci-fi television series Outland, about a gay sci-fi fan club. Anu plays wheelchair using Rae, the sole female member of the group.

In August 2020, Anu was revealed to be the 'Goldfish' in the second season of The Masked Singer Australia and was the third contestant unmasked, placing 10th overall.

Radio
In December 2015, ABC announced that Anu will host the Evenings radio program on ABC Radio Sydney, ABC Radio Canberra and ABC Local Radio stations across New South Wales. Anu  shared the role with Dominic Knight, then took over full reins in April after Knight's resignation. In the first half of 2016 the program suffered a dip in the ratings after she began hosting.

In November 2016, ABC announced will host a national Evenings program on Friday and Saturday across ABC Local Radio. Chris Bath replaced Anu as host of Evenings from Monday to Thursday on ABC Radio Sydney, ABC Radio Canberra and ABC Local Radio stations across New South Wales.

Personal life
Anu is a mother of two, son Kuiam (born 1996) and daughter Zipporah (born 2002). Zipporah's father is actor Rodger Corser.

Anu married her childhood sweetheart, Simon Deutrom, in 2010. 

In June 2016, Anu announced that she and Deutrom were separating after six years of marriage.

On 24 February 2020, Anu pleaded guilty in the Rockhampton Magistrates Court to mid-range drink driving after recording a blood alcohol reading of 0.109 after she was pulled over by police in Rockhampton on New Year's Eve.  Magistrate Philippa Beckinsale fined Anu $650 and suspended her driver's license for three months.

Discography

Studio albums
 Stylin' Up (1995) 
 Come My Way (2000)
 45 Degrees (2003)
 Acoustically (2005) 
 Chrissy's Island Family (2007)
 Rewind: The Aretha Franklin Songbook (2012)
 Island Christmas (2014)

Live albums
 Intimate and Deadly (2010)
 ReStylin' Up 20 Years (2015)

Filmography

Films and television

Theatre and stage performances

Awards and nominations

ARIA Awards
The ARIA Music Awards are a set of annual ceremonies presented by Australian Recording Industry Association (ARIA), which recognise excellence, innovation, and achievement across all genres of the music of Australia. They commenced in 1987.

Australian Women in Music Awards
The Australian Women in Music Awards is an annual event that celebrates outstanding women in the Australian Music Industry who have made significant and lasting contributions in their chosen field. They commenced in 2018.

|-
| rowspan="2" | 2019
| Christine Anu
| Diversity in Music Award
| 
|-
| Christine Anu
| Artistic Excellence Award
|

Deadly Awards
The Deadly Awards, (commonly known simply as The Deadlys), was an annual celebration of Australian Aboriginal and Torres Strait Islander achievement in music, sport, entertainment and community. They ran from 1996 to 2013.

|-
| Deadly Awards 1996
| "herself"
| Female Artist of the Year
| 
|-
| Deadly Awards 1998
| "herself"
| Female Artist of the Year
| 
|-
| Deadly Awards 2000
| "Sunshine on a Rainy Day"
| Single of the Year
| 
|-
| Deadly Awards 2003
| "herself"
| Female Artist of the Year
| 
|-
| Deadly Awards 2004
| "Talk About Love"
| Single of the Year
| 
|-

Green Room Awards

References

External links

Christine Anu official web site

Allmusic Christine Anu entry
Intimate and Deadly
Black is Blue tour
Interview with Christine Anu

Living people
1970 births
21st-century Australian singers
21st-century Australian women singers
APRA Award winners
ARIA Award winners
Australian children's television presenters
Australian women pop singers
Australian women television presenters
Indigenous Australian actresses
Indigenous Australian musicians
MGM Records artists
Mushroom Records artists
Musicians from Queensland
People from Cairns
Torres Strait Islands culture
Torres Strait Islanders
Blinky Bill